Karima is a town in Northern State in Sudan some 400 km from Khartoum on a loop of the Nile.

Karima houses the Jebel Barkal Museum. The hill of Jebel Barkal is near Karima.  Beside it are the ruins of Napata, a city-state of ancient Nubia on the west bank of the Nile River, including the temples of Amun and Mut.

The Shaigiya tribe lived around Karima and Korti, but suffered for their support of the British against the Mahdi.

The land around Karima is a center for cultivation of Barakawi dates.

Karima is a terminus of a branch narrow gauge railway of the Sudan Railways system.

Halfway between Karima and El-Kurru there is an area with a large number of petrified trees.

Climate
Karima has a hot desert climate (Köppen climate classification BWh).

See also 

 Jebel Barkal
 Napata
 Railway stations in Sudan

References 

Populated places in Northern (state)
Populated places on the Nile